Taitung Forest Park is a park at Taitung City, Taitung County, Taiwan.

Name
The park is nicknamed the Black Forest by the local residents due to its immense dark beefwood trees.

History
On 18 February 2021, an unmanned aerial vehicle belonged to National Chung-Shan Institute of Science and Technology which took off from Chihhang Air Base crash landed at the park.

Geology
The park has an area of 280 hectares, which consists of lakes, one of them is Pipa Lake. The lake is the habitat for aquatic animals and plants. There are also viewing platform and cabin for waterfowl viewing, as well as other activities such as walking or cycling along the bike trail.

Transportation
The park is accessible South East from Taitung Station of the Taiwan Railways.

See also
 List of parks in Taiwan

References

Year of establishment missing
Forest parks in Taiwan
Geography of Taitung County
Tourist attractions in Taitung County
Parks in Taitung County